Shobaleader One: d'Demonstrator is a 2010 album from Squarepusher and his band Shobaleader One.

Track listing

References

2010 albums